Thomas Edward Jenkins (known as Edward; 14 August 1902 – 28 August 1996) was an eminent Anglican priest.

Jenkins was educated at St David's College, Lampeter. He was ordained in 1925 and began his ecclesiastical career with a curacy at  Llanelli. From 1934 to 1938 he was Rector of Begelly. From then until 1946 he was Vicar of Christ Church, Llanelli after which he was Rural Dean of Lampeter. He was Vicar of Cardigan from 1955 to 1957 when he became Dean of St David's, a post he held for 15 years.

References

1902 births
Alumni of the University of Wales, Lampeter
Welsh Anglicans
Deans of St Davids
1996 deaths